Yves Buysse (born 1968) is a Belgian politician and a member of the Vlaams Belang. He was elected as a member of the Belgian Senate from 2007 to 2014 and has been a member of the Flemish Parliament since 2019.

Buysse was an insurance consultant before entering politics and worked as an assistant to former Vlaams Blok and Vlaams Belang leader Frank Vanhecke.

Notes

Living people
Vlaams Belang politicians
Members of the Belgian Federal Parliament
1968 births
21st-century Belgian politicians